Down to Earth is the eighth studio album by British heavy metal vocalist Ozzy Osbourne. Released on 16 October 2001, it reached number 19 on the UK Albums Chart and number four on the US Billboard 200. "The Ozzfest was doing well", Osbourne explained. "I just wanted to be like the Grateful Dead and keep it going by touring, but the record company said they'd like a new Ozzy album."

Down to Earth spawned just two singles, although both reached the top ten of the US Hot Mainstream Rock Tracks chart and reached number 18 on the UK Singles Chart.

Excluding his contributions to re-recordings of Ozzy's earlier material, Down to Earth is the only Osbourne studio album to feature bassist Robert Trujillo, who left to join Metallica in 2003. It was the first Osbourne album to feature drummer Mike Bordin, previously of Faith No More, though he had played live with Osbourne since 1996, as well as the last to feature guitarist Zakk Wylde until 2007's Black Rain. Though he plays on the album, Wylde did not contribute as a songwriter for the first time since joining Osbourne's band in 1988, because many of the songs were written before Wylde rejoined the band. Osbourne's previous guitarist Joe Holmes was involved in the writing and Osbourne chose to use outside songwriters such as producer Tim Palmer and Aerosmith collaborator Marti Frederiksen.

"Working with Tim on this album reminded me of [late guitarist] Randy [Rhoads]", Ozzy remarked of Palmer. "If it hadn't been for him, there wouldn't have been an album ... He has incredible patience, just like Randy."

Track listing

Personnel
Primary musicians
Ozzy Osbourne – vocals
Zakk Wylde – guitars
Robert Trujillo – bass
Mike Bordin – drums

Additional musicians
Tim Palmer – rhythm guitar, acoustic guitar, keyboards, military drums, backing vocals, production, mixing
Michael Railo – keyboards, string arrangements, backing vocals
Danny Saber – additional guitars on "Alive"
Production and artwork personnel

Mark Dearnley – engineering, mixing
Jamie Sickora – engineering assistance
Alex Uychocde – mixing assistance
John Porter – Pro Tools engineering
Stephen Marcussen – mastering
Stewart Whitmore – digital editing
David Coleman – art direction
Nitin Vadukul – photography

Charts

Weekly charts

Year-end charts

Singles

Certifications 

|+Certifications for Down to Earth by Ozzy Osbourne

References

External links
 

Ozzy Osbourne albums
2001 albums
Albums produced by Tim Palmer
Epic Records albums